James Andrew Coyne (born December 23, 1960) is a Canadian columnist with The Globe and Mail and a member of the At Issue panel on CBC's The National. Previously, he has been national editor for Maclean's and a columnist with National Post.

Early life and education
Coyne was born in Ottawa, Ontario, the son of Hope Meribeth Cameron (née Stobie) and James Elliott Coyne, who was governor of the Bank of Canada from 1955 to 1961. His paternal great-grandfather was historian and lawyer James Henry Coyne. His sister is actress Susan Coyne. He is also the cousin of constitutional lawyer Deborah Coyne, who is the mother of Pierre Trudeau's youngest child.

Coyne graduated from Kelvin High School in Winnipeg. Coyne studied at the University of Manitoba where he became the editor of The Manitoban student newspaper. He also spent two years reporting for the Winnipeg Sun. In 1981, Coyne transferred to the University of Toronto's Trinity College, where his classmates included Jim Balsillie, Malcolm Gladwell, Tony Clement, Nigel Wright, Patricia Pearson, Atom Egoyan, and author and political strategist John Duffy. He received a BA in economics and history from Trinity. Coyne then went to the London School of Economics, where he received his master's degree in economics.

Career 
 
After a six-year period as a Financial Post columnist from 1985 to 1991, Coyne joined The Globe and Mail's editorial board. There, Coyne won two consecutive National Newspaper Awards for his work. He had a regular column in the Globe between 1994 and 1996, when he joined Southam News (later CanWest News Service) as a nationally syndicated columnist.

Coyne became a columnist with the National Post – the successor to the Financial Post – when it launched in 1998. Coyne left the Post in 2007 to work at Maclean's.

Coyne left Maclean's in 2011 to return to the Post as a columnist. In December 2014, he was appointed to the position of Editor, Editorials and Comment. After years of writing a weekly Saturday column, Coyne's contribution was absent from the edition published just prior to the 2015 Canadian federal election, because the column he wanted to submit called for a vote against the Conservative Party of Canada while the Post's editorial board had endorsed the Conservatives. While Coyne was the head of the editorial board, the decision to endorse the Conservatives was made by the newspaper's publisher Paul Godfrey. On election day, Coyne announced that as a result of the paper refusing to run his election column, he was resigning as the Post's editorial page and comment editor but would remain as a columnist.

Coyne has also been published in The Wall Street Journal, National Review, Saturday Night, the now-defunct Canadian edition of Time, and other publications. Coyne has also written for the conservative magazine The Next City.

Coyne has been a longtime member of the At Issue panel on CBC's The National, where he appeared as early as 2012 in the day of Peter Mansbridge. His role on the panel hosted by CBC Chief Political Correspondent Rosemary Barton has made him a household name appearing every Thursday evening alongside panelists Chantal Hébert and Althia Raj.

In November 2019, Coyne announced that he would henceforth be employed by The Globe and Mail.

Views 
Coyne has said that he considers the political labels "left" and "right" to be "tribes" of "self-quarantine."  He has endorsed a strong federal government, more market based economic solutions, and a stronger role for Canada in the War on Terror.   Coyne is also a proponent of proportional representation in the House of Commons of Canada and believes Canada should remain a constitutional monarchy rather than become a republic. He has parodied politicians who apologize vaguely, deflect blame, and ask for forgiveness for their mistakes, rather than accept the consequences of their actions.

Honours

Scholastic

Honorary degrees

Awards

See also
 List of newspaper columnists
Neoconservatism

References

External links

 
 Proportional Representation: Lessons from Ontario - keynote speech at Fair Vote Canada AGM

1960 births
Alumni of the London School of Economics
Canadian bloggers
Canadian columnists
Canadian monarchists
Canadian political commentators
CBC Television people
Living people
Online journalists
Writers from Ottawa
Writers from Winnipeg
Trinity College (Canada) alumni
University of Toronto alumni
The Globe and Mail columnists
National Post people
Canadian newspaper editors
Canadian male journalists
Canadian magazine editors
Andrew
Maclean's writers and editors
Canadian political journalists
Male bloggers